Richard "Rick" Dirrane Bowes (born 1944) is an American author of science fiction and fantasy.

Biography 
Bowes was born in 1944 in Boston, Massachusetts. He attended school both in Boston and on Long Island, New York. His brother is fine artist, David Bowes. In his third year, he took writing courses with Mark Eisenstein at Hofstra University. After graduation, Bowes moved to Manhattan where he has lived since 1965, doing the usual jumble of things that writers do in order to earn a living. He launched his Speculative Fiction writing career in the early 1980s and published novels Warchild, Feral Cell and Goblin Market.

In 1992, Bowes began writing a series of semi-autobiographical stories narrated by Kevin Grierson.  These stories were published primarily in The Magazine of Fantasy & Science Fiction, and later became the novel Minions of the Moon.  One story, "Streetcar Dreams," won the World Fantasy Award for Best Novella in 1998. The novel itself won the Lambda Literary Award in 2000.

A short fiction collection, Transfigured Night and Other Stories, was published by Time Warner in 2001. It included the original novella My Life in Speculative Fiction. These stories plus recent material appeared in Streetcar Dreams and Other Midnight Fancies from England's PS Publishing in 2006.

In recent years, Bowes has written a series of stories about Time Rangers and the Gods, which have formed the mosaic novel From the Files of the Time Rangers, published September 2005 by Golden Gryphon Press. Two of the stories - novelettes "The Ferryman’s Wife" and "The Mask of the Rex", both originally published in The Magazine of Fantasy & Science Fiction, were finalists for the prestigious Nebula Award, in 2002 and 2003 respectively.  Other Time Rangers stories have appeared in Sci Fiction and Black Gate.

In 2013 Bowes published the novel/story cycle Dust Devils on a Quiet Street, about a group of writers in New York City before, during, and after 9/11.  Dust Devil appeared on the World Fantasy and Lambda Award short lists.

The first chapter is his widely reprinted 2005 short story "There's a Hole in the City", which won the 2006 StorySouth Million Writers Award, The International Horror Guild Award and was nominated for a Nebula.

"If Angels Fight" won the Novella 2009 World Fantasy Award.  The story was published in the February 2008 edition of The Magazine of Fantasy & Science Fiction. "I Needs Must Part, the Policeman Said" was nominated in the Best Novella category for the 2010 World Fantasy Awards.  The story ran in the December 2009 edition of  F&SF.

Bibliography

 
 Feral Cell 
 Goblin Market
 Minions of the Moon
 Transfigured Night and Other Stories
 Streetcar Dreams and Other Midnight Fancies
 
 
 Dust Devils on a Quiet Street (2013)

References

External links
Richard Bowes official site
 
Golden Gryphon Press official site - About From the Files of the Time Rangers

20th-century American novelists
20th-century American male writers
American fantasy writers
American male novelists
American science fiction writers
Hofstra University alumni
Living people
American LGBT novelists
American male short story writers
The Magazine of Fantasy & Science Fiction people
American gay writers
World Fantasy Award-winning writers
1944 births
20th-century American short story writers